The Pain Goes On Forever was a New Zealand hit for John Rowles. It was the follow up to his second hit, Hush Not A Word To Mary.

Background
The song was released on CBS BA 461211 in September 1968. It was written by Luigi Ingrosso, Gaetano Savio, and Franco Califano. Mike Leander is also credited in the composition as well as the arrangement and production. The B side "All My Loves Laughter" was written by Jimmy Webb and was also arranged and produced by Leander. 

The song didn't chart in the UK, and Rowles wouldn't have another hit there. It was a hit in New Zealand and by February 28, 1969, it was at #2 on The N.Z. Hit Parade.

References

John Rowles songs
1969 singles
1969 songs
MCA Records singles
Songs written by Mike Leander
Songs written by Totò Savio